Patricia and Jean-Baptiste is a Canadian comedy-drama film, directed by Jean Pierre Lefebvre and released in 1968. The film stars Lefebvre as Jean-Baptiste, a factory worker who is directed by his employer to take Patricia (Patricia Kaden-Lacroix), a woman who has recently immigrated from France to take a job as secretary at the factory, on a tour of Montreal, during which he both develops a romantic interest in Patricia and transforms his own dismissive view of the city.

The film was partially inspired by, but not a literal retelling of, Lefebvre's own relationship with his wife, film producer and French immigrant Marguerite Duparc.

Lefebvre's 1984 film Le jour S... revisited the story of Jean-Baptiste, following his divorce and his initiation of a relationship with a new woman. Unlike Patricia and Jean-Baptiste, however, Lefebvre did not play the role of Jean-Baptiste himself in the sequel, instead casting actor Pierre Curzi.

In 1990, the film was chosen as one of the 1960s representatives in Montreal à travers trois décennies de cinéma québécois, a retrospective program of films depicting Montreal, alongside the films À tout prendre, The Cat in the Bag (Le chat dans le sac), The Merry World of Leopold Z (La vie heureuse de Léopold Z) and Between Salt and Sweet Water (Entre la mer et l'eau douce).

References

External links

1968 films
Canadian comedy-drama films
1968 comedy-drama films
Films directed by Jean Pierre Lefebvre
Films shot in Montreal
French-language Canadian films
1960s Canadian films